The Bobby Orr Trophy is awarded annually to the champion of the Eastern conference playoffs in the Ontario Hockey League. It was first awarded in 1999. The winning team competes for the J. Ross Robertson Cup in the OHL finals versus the Wayne Gretzky Trophy winner.

The trophy is named in honour of Bobby Orr, a graduate of the Oshawa Generals, and a recurring coach in the CHL Top Prospects Game. Orr played and 193 games with the Generals from 1962 to 1966, scoring 280 points. He won the J. Ross Robertson Cup in the 1965–66 season, and led the Generals to a 1966 Memorial Cup appearance.

Winners
List of winners of the Bobby Orr Trophy.

See also
 List of Canadian Hockey League awards

References

External links
 Ontario Hockey League

Ontario Hockey League trophies and awards
Awards established in 1999
1999 establishments in Ontario